Avril-sur-Loire (literally Avril on Loire) is a commune in the Nièvre department in central France.

Population

See also
 Communes of the Nièvre department

References

Communes of Nièvre